Negan (full name in the television series: Negan Smith) is a fictional character in the comic book series The Walking Dead and in the television series of the same name. He was the leader of the Saviors, a group of survivors in the Sanctuary that oppresses other survivor communities and forces them to pay tribute to him. In the comics, the character's appearance is based on Henry Rollins, as confirmed by Charlie Adlard. Jeffrey Dean Morgan portrays Negan in the television series, having first appeared in the sixth-season finale.

After Rick Grimes and his fellow survivors agree to begin a trading relationship with the Hilltop Colony, they are ambushed by the Saviors and forced to obey Negan's orders to give the Saviors half of their supplies, as the other communities do. Initially obedient, Rick and the others secretly conspire with other communities in the Washington, D.C. area to prepare for war against the Saviors. After his defeat at the hands of the allied communities led by Rick, he is incarcerated for years until Carol recruits him as a reluctant ally against the Whisperers. After Negan kills the Whisperers' leaders Alpha and later Beta, the other survivors reluctantly accept him as an official member of their community.

Morgan has received critical acclaim for his portrayal of Negan in the television series, earning the Critics' Choice Television Award for Best Guest Performer in a Drama Series, MTV Movie Award for Best Villain, and Saturn Award for Best Guest Starring Role on Television. When offered the role of Negan, Morgan immediately accepted, as he was already a fan of the comic book series.

Negan was chosen by Katsuhiro Harada and Michael Murray as a guest character for the fighting game Tekken 7,  as they are fans of the television show and the character and thought he be a "perfect fit" for the video game series.

Creation 
Robert Kirkman conceptualized the character after scrapping the idea of Rick Grimes being forced to protect his son, Carl Grimes, by killing fellow survivor Glenn Rhee.

Jeffrey Dean Morgan was cast as Negan in 2015. He made his television debut in the sixth-season finale.

Comic book series

Here's Negan 
Prior to the outbreak, Negan lived in Reston, Virginia and was the coach of a local high school, keeping his players in line through intimidation and bullying. He is happily married to his wife, Lucille, but nonetheless has a mistress on the side who doesn't know he is married. During an argument, Lucille collapses and he rushes her to the hospital, where she is diagnosed with cancer. As his wife is tended to, Negan tells his mistress the truth, and she immediately leaves him. When the zombie apocalypse starts, the hospital workers tell Negan they are being forced to abandon the hospital and he should leave with them, but he refuses to leave Lucille's side. Lucille dies when the power goes out, short-circuiting her life-support machine; moments later, she reanimates as a zombie. He flees the hospital and finds a boy being trapped by zombies, and helps to dispatch them with a fire extinguisher. In return, Negan asks the boy to kill Lucille for him.

A Larger World 
At some point after the outbreak, Negan is found by a group led by a man named Dwight. He slowly takes control over this group from Dwight, renaming them the Saviors and ruling them with an iron fist. He also takes a baseball bat from another survivor and wraps it in barbed wire and names it after his late wife Lucille. Negan, along with his team (which includes at least 50 others), makes a deal with the Hilltop Colony: the Saviors would use the weaponry the other group was lacking to cull all zombies wandering near the Hilltop's premises; in return, the Saviors would obtain half of Hilltop's supplies, such as livestock and crops. Negan punishes even the smallest infraction (real or perceived) with brutal violence; for example, he orders the death of Hilltop's leader, Gregory, because he feels Gregory is not sufficiently loyal.

Something To Fear 
Later, Negan, along with 50 other Saviors, sneaks up on Rick Grimes' group and subdues Rick by surprise. They line up all of the survivors from the van (Rick, Carl, Glenn, Maggie, Sophia, Michonne, and Heath), telling them that Negan wants revenge for the Saviors who were killed. Without Rick's consent, Negan imposes a binding deal: everything that belongs to the Alexandria Safe-Zone now belongs to the Saviors. Negan also introduces his weapon of choice; Lucille, a baseball bat covered in barbed wire.

After a long talk about the new world order and whom he should beat to death using Lucille, he finally chooses Glenn as his victim in a random game of "eeny meeny miny moe". Glenn's attempts to talk Negan out of executing him are ignored as Negan slams Lucille down hard on Glenn's head, smashing his skull. Negan laughs as Glenn attempts to get to his feet, the former remarking that "he's taking it like a champ" before swinging Lucille at Glenn, dislocating his jaw, and finally beating Glenn to death.

Negan tells the group that the Saviors will be back in one week to collect half of everything they have, threatening more deaths should they refuse. Rick vows to avenge Glenn by killing Negan, amusing the latter, who beats Rick with his bare hands in response before he and the other Saviors leave the survivors to mourn over Glenn's body.

What Comes After 
Negan and the Saviors later arrive at the Alexandria Safe-Zone for their first offering. Negan and the Saviors begin killing the roamers in the surrounding area and scavenge each of the houses for supplies. Negan and his men depart from the Safe-Zone with supplies, but, unbeknownst to them, Carl is hiding in the truck with an assault rifle. Once the Saviors get back to their base, Negan is amazed to see that Dwight is still alive. A Savior finds Carl, and Carl uses the rifle to kill six Saviors. They surround Carl, and he demands to speak with Negan. When Negan arrives, Carl fires at them until he loses control of his gun. Dwight is about to kill Carl when Negan stops Dwight and says, "Is that any way to treat our new guest?"

Instead of taking immediate action against Carl, Negan shows interest in getting to know him. He goes as far as to lead him through the Saviors' facilities, revealing that he is the leader of a cult-like domain of selfless followers who bow to his every word and command. Many followers in his ranks are living on a point system in order to sustain their lives, though many give in to his graces in exchange for a better lifestyle, most notably the women in his "harem", whom he considers his "wives".

Negan reveals that he would like to get to know Carl a little better, but he gets distracted by Carl's bandaged face. He orders Carl to remove the bandages. Carl allows him to see it only after being threatened; he removes the bandages to reveal that he is missing an eye after having been shot in the face. Negan, in a state of disbelief and awe, jokingly mocks the disfigurement and goes as far as to ask Carl if he can touch the part of his skull showing through Carl's exposed eye-socket, which causes Carl to break finally and cry. In a rare moment of compassion, Negan apologizes, seeing that he has finally found a weakness in the child he finds so dangerous.

In a ritualistic fashion, complete with call-and-response chanting, with the followers answering to Negan's words, Negan demonstrates that he punishes whoever displeases him by searing their faces with a hot iron. Tied to the end of a pole, the tool is held over a fire before being handed to Negan, who presses it against the victim's face as punishment for their offense. In this case, it is the face of Amber's former lover Mark, who is left disfigured in the same manner as Dwight, with a portion of his face permanently scarred and an eyeball exposed. After the ritual, Negan dismisses his congregation before turning to Carl, who hands back "Lucille", and Negan leads him away, contemplating what to do with him.

Negan runs into Rick while the latter was on his way to find Carl. Negan tells Rick how eager he is to show him "what he has done to his son". Rick, in a fit of rage, then attacks Negan before Negan reveals that Carl is fine, and Negan clarifies that he is eager to show Rick "that he has done nothing to his son."

March to War 
Several days later, Negan arrives at the Alexandria Safe-Zone a few days ahead of schedule; he's informed that the community is "practically" out of supplies, and Rick went out looking for more. Negan decides that he will stay in Alexandria until Rick returns from the supply run. Negan is later approached by Spencer Monroe who tells Negan that Rick is not a suitable leader for the community and asks that once Negan assassinates Rick, he be given control over the Safe-Zone. He responds by telling Spencer that Rick may hate him, but, he has guts, unlike Spencer, who acted like a coward. Negan then slashes Spencer's stomach, killing him almost instantly.

Rick later returns with supplies. Negan initially demands all of it but then decides to take nothing, as repayment for having killed Spencer. Rick insists that they take their share, and Negan has no objections. As the Saviors are driving back to the foundry, Negan notices Rick and a few others are following them. An instant later, the driver is shot and killed. Confused and angry, Negan takes Lucille and sees Rick pointing a gun at his head. Suddenly, a gunshot is heard, and Rick's gun is destroyed as well as those of the others who came out with him. Negan remarks on how stupid Rick and the others are to use bullets on the roamers instead of saving them for "the much more dangerous thinkers" (i.e., the living). Negan reveals that before every pickup, he has a back-up team armed with guns surround the Safe-Zone and guard the area while he and the other Saviors go in and salvage for supplies. With a crazed smile on his face, Negan leans into Rick and says that he and the Safe-Zone residents are "fucking fucked."

Negan smiles and says that in a stand-off situation, snipers tend to give away their position after several shots. He clarifies that Rick's "sniper bitch", Andrea, is "as good as dead," provoking Rick to strike him. As Negan holds him off, Carl shoots off a portion of Lucille, causing the Saviors to open fire at the Safe-Zone walls. Negan orders them to stop, and issues an ultimatum: "Give me the boy, or I'll bash in all four skulls of the people out here!" Negan admits that he liked Carl at first and that he never had a child of his own; if he did, he would have wanted him to be like Carl. Rick says that if Carl dies, their agreement is over, but, Negan states that it already is over. He orders his men to line up Rick, Heath, Nicholas, and Holly, then begins to decide which one to kill first. He notices a figure falling from the bell tower and smugly repeats that he knew Rick's sniper was good as dead, not realizing that it's not Andrea, but Connor.

Negan taunts Rick about Andrea's supposed demise, and Nicholas interrupts him, pleading for his life. Negan berates Nicholas for doing this and accuses him of being a coward. He asks Rick, Heath, or Holly to ask him to kill Nicholas and says if they do so, he will spare them. However, Heath tells him, no, and so Negan begins to pick which one of them he will kill.

Negan is interrupted when Paul "Jesus" Monroe grabs a Savior by the foot and uses him as a human shield. Negan tells his men to stand down, and when he does this, Jesus leaps out of a trench and kicks the nearest Savior in the face. Jesus orders Rick and the others into a trench and proceeds to fight his way towards Negan. When Jesus reaches Negan, he manages to disarm him and hold him hostage. Jesus stalls the Saviors until Ezekiel and his men arrive. Negan breaks free from Jesus and runs to a truck, where he retreats back to the Sanctuary with his men. Negan is later seen back at the Sanctuary, where he gives the Saviors a speech about their being the dominant force in the world, and the need to remind people of that. Negan then states they are going to war.

All Out War 
Several days later, Rick's army arrives at the Saviors' base and demands that Negan come out. Rick offers him a chance to surrender and spare the women and children in his community. Negan refuses Rick's offer, and reveals that Gregory has defected to the Saviors, meaning that Hilltop is now under Negan's control. He calls Dwight, ordering him to bring the men from the outposts back to help drive off Rick's army. Dwight agrees but due to the commotion, Negan doesn't notice the former's hesitation to act immediately. As more men rush outside, Negan orders them to start shooting the army before all their snipers are killed. He suddenly notices that all their snipers are taking cover and is initially confused as to why Rick's militia are shooting not the snipers, but the windows. He then notices the large herd of zombies that are rapidly approaching the Sanctuary walls. Suddenly, Holly drives through the fence, destroying a portion of it and letting the herd inside. Negan frantically orders his men back inside the foundry but notices that Holly is still alive. He sees a zombie about to kill her and dispatches it. As she looks up, Negan smiles and says that she wasn't "going to get off THAT fucking easy." As the walkers converge on the courtyard area, the Saviors retreat inside the foundry to develop a new strategy.

Negan delivers an analogy to a group of Saviors about how you can destroy a man "by fucking his vagina", meaning that the best way to destroy a man's heart is by destroying the woman he loves; Negan clearly believes this to be Holly. She corrects him by saying he's got the wrong woman; Rick loves Andrea, and she was in love with Abraham, the man Dwight killed. Negan refuses to listen, insisting that she is the one who killed Connor "and a terrible liar." He then orders her taken away and goes off to clear his head. Later, Negan is seen outside with more Saviors trying to clear the courtyard of all the zombies, swearing that if any of them die he will "fuck them up." Eventually, too many roamers pour in the fence and Negan's group retreat inside once more. Negan realizes that if the herd keeps them stuck inside for more than one day, they will all be dead, and he orders squads outside every two hours to clean up the infestation by any means necessary. He goes to interrogate Holly, but catches David in the middle of trying to rape her. Negan demands that he get away from her and grabs him by the collar. He angrily reminds David one of the Savior's main rules: "We don't rape". As punishment for breaking this rule, Negan proceeds to stab David in the neck and apologizes to Holly, telling her that "they [The Saviors] aren't monsters."

Negan gets word of one of his outposts being overrun by Rick's army and sends more men to fortify the remaining ones. This, in turn, leads to Ezekiel's army being eradicated in a failed attack. Negan also finds a way to eliminate all of the zombies that had flooded into the Sanctuary's courtyard, for he is later seen heading towards Alexandria. When he arrives at the Safe-Zone, he throws a grenade over the wall, demolishing one of the houses and getting Rick's attention. He threatens that 'there's more where that came from' and insists that he's here to parlay. To support his claim, he has a blindfolded Holly brought out of his truck and offers to release her back to Rick. Rick agrees to talk only when Holly is safely back inside, and Negan agrees. This is later shown to be a ploy: it is revealed that Negan had Holly killed and she later reanimated. As the Alexandrians are distracted by this revelation, Negan orders his men to surround Alexandria and throws another grenade over the wall. Suddenly, gunfire erupts from behind several buildings. Surprised by this, Negan orders his men behind one of the trucks. He asks for one more grenade to use as cover and tells his men "the last boat is leaving... you'd better fucking be on it." He manages to escape, and they can make a fast exit. When a Savior makes an offhand comment about retreating, Negan retorts that this wasn't a retreat. Pointing towards the smoke coming from Alexandria, he comments that this means they've "just fucking won."

After successfully bombarding Alexandria, Negan leads his men back to Sanctuary. He sees a herd of roamers attacking several people from Alexandria. He orders his men to kill the roamers and wonders aloud why they are out here beyond the wall. Nevertheless, he orders Eugene Porter and the others to be taken back with them. Later, Negan finds out that Eugene was making ammunition for Rick's army and goes to see him. Flanked by Dwight and Carson, Negan orders Eugene to begin producing ammo for the Saviors. When the latter refuses, Negan hands Carson Lucille, and tells Eugene what will happen if he refuses to cooperate; smiling, he says that he could disfigure Eugene's face or castrate him. Eugene still refuses to betray Rick, and Negan leaves Eugene "with his thoughts and his dick... while he still has it." Early the following day, Negan reveals to the Saviors that he has come up with a plan that will help them win the war. He has assembled a group of roamers inside the courtyard to demonstrate his idea, exclaiming "they are the lynchpin of our plans going forward." Reminding them about the fever that comes from getting bit or from any other injury caused by a roamer, Negan approaches one with Lucille. After apologizing to Lucille, Negan begins to rub it all over the roamer, covering the bat with guts and the bacteria that causes the fever. Holding up 'the new and improved Lucille,' Negan says that even the slightest touch from Lucille will now essentially be a death sentence. He orders the Saviors to do the same to their weapons. Arriving at the Hilltop later that day, Negan and his men hide in the forest just outside the Hilltop. He then issues the order: "We attack at sundown."

Several hours later, Negan and his troops arrive at the Hilltop gates, demanding to see Rick. Kal is atop the wall and threatens them by saying they won't survive what's behind the walls. Negan tells him to bring Rick, but Kal says, "you're talking to me." Insulted, Negan has one of his men shoot Kal off the wall. Once again, Negan demands Rick to show himself. After no response from him, Negan orders his men to move in. The Saviors pour into the Hilltop and begin to kill off the residents. As gunfire continues to erupt towards them, Negan and Dwight are separated from the other Saviors. Negan is unaware that Dwight is loading an arrow to kill him when he spots Rick away from the other survivors. He tells Dwight to shoot Rick. Dwight reluctantly does so, hitting Rick in the side. After this, Negan declares that "without him, they're nothing. Game fucking over."

After Rick is hit with the arrow, Negan and Dwight retreat to the rest of The Savior horde, hoping to devise a plan of attack against the remaining survivors at Hilltop. By now, the Saviors have re-grouped, and Negan orders them to get ready for their attack on the Hilltop mansion. When they begin their attack, they are immediately surrounded by Rick's forces, so Negan orders them to retreat and head back to The Savior camps on the hillside. Negan assumes that Rick is dead and that the war is essentially over, reasoning that Rick's forces have neither the manpower to counterattack nor the will to keep fighting without their leader. Negan says that he will be their Savior again, as long as they let him urinate on Rick's dead body.

Negan arrives at Hilltop's gates and offers to accept their surrender, asking to send out whoever is now in charge - and is stunned when Rick emerges to greet him. Negan asks Rick to surrender, to "let things go back the way they were", but Rick refuses. Rick goes on to say that they should pool their resources and people together, and in the current situation, the only ones who are “winning” are the undead. Negan takes this all in, and Rick says that they can take their supplies, but they must give the survivors something in return; make supplies of their own to give or trade for others via a barter system. Negan realizes that he has only inflicted suffering upon the communities that he has “saved”, and apologizes. Rick then slashes Negan's throat with a knife. Negan tackles Rick and begins beating him, Negan gets the better of him and breaks Rick's leg. Laughing, Negan passes out from blood loss. He wakes up inside one of the rooms in the Hilltop and sees Rick standing over him. Rick reveals that he's going to keep Negan alive so he can see the survivors’ new civilization flourish without him. Rick also tells Negan that he will spend the rest of his life in jail.

A New Beginning 
Two years after the war, Carl goes to the basement of an unknown house and talks to a figure in the shadows. He then says to Carl that he enjoys their talks, which help him keep track of the time and days passed. Carl says he is leaving, but before he leaves, the figure asks him if, after all this time, all the things they have shared and the talks they have had, Carl still wants to kill him. He turns around and faces the person behind bars, simply saying: "Yes, Negan. You know I do." Negan asks how he was supposed to know that Carl wanted to kill him and tells him not to insult his intelligence. Negan says that he thought the two of them were friends to which Carl walks away, making Negan retreat into the corner of his cell.

Negan asks if Rick is taking Carl to the Hilltop, slightly shocking Rick. Negan says that he and Carl are friends and that Rick could not break that bond. Negan tells Rick that he is just getting things ready for him and that he will not be in his cell forever. Rick says that he knows Negan will die behind bars, to which Negan says that he won't and that deep down, Rick knows he should have killed Negan.

Magna and her group later come down to see who was in the jail. When they walk down the stairs to where Negan is being held, Negan grabs the bars to his cell and asks if they are here to rescue him, saying that "they're animals." This shocks Magna and her group. Negan begs to be released and claims Rick is a monster who locked him up and tortured him for speaking out against him. However, Magna does not believe him, having seen actual victims of torture. Negan admits he was lying but had to give it a try. Magna and her companions leave the cell.

Life and Death 
Some time later, Negan is bathing and having his hair cut by Olivia outside his cell door. After finishing, Negan walks back to his cell at gunpoint from Andrea, who calls him a "fucking monster". Olivia then proceeds to lock the door, and they both leave Negan alone. However, it turns out Olivia didn't lock Negan's cell properly as the door swings open, which Negan notices. However, Negan decides not to escape and remains in his cell with the door open until Rick comes downstairs, then taunts him about the numerous ways he could have destroyed Alexandria without anyone realizing, but claimed to stay as sign of good faith and an offering to amend their trust. As Rick locks up the cage and leaves, Negan taunts him again by stating the only reason he is alive is so Rick can prove to himself that he is still a good person, and that he wants everyone else to believe he is the only one who can fix the world.

No Turning Back 
After a tumultuous community meeting about Rick's proposed plan regarding the Whisperers, Rick goes to Negan's cell and asks for his help. He fills him in on everything that has happened since they have come into conflict with this new group. Negan advises Rick to keep his group happy, even if that means lying to them, touting his expertise as leader of the Saviors, some of whom disliked him. Rick leaves, and Negan grins. When Negan hears the chants and cheers of Rick's name at a later town meeting, Negan smiles and says, "atta boy."

Call to Arms 
While in his cell, Negan is approached by Brandon Rose, a young Hilltop resident who bears a grudge against Rick, Carl, Sophia, and the Whisperers; Rick killed his father as an act of self-defense, Carl beat him up after he had attacked Sophia who beat him up, and Alpha beheaded his mother. He proposes to help Negan escape, and Negan says he will think about it. Later on, Rick and Michonne discover Negan's empty cell. After his escape, Negan and Brandon enter Whisperer terrain. Here Brandon tells Negan that he wants Negan to pit Rick and the Whisperers against one another. In response, Negan stabs Brandon in the chest and enters the Whisperer zone alone. Shortly afterward, Negan is ambushed by a group of Whisperers led by Beta and is taken, prisoner. They bring him to Alpha. Negan introduces himself and declares his love for Alpha. Negan starts to live with the Whisperers, though without Beta's trust. During a night at camp, Negan sees two Whisperers trying to rape a woman. He stops them but is knocked down by Beta for interfering. Alpha explains that they allow for things like this to happen for women to prove their strength, causing Negan to become angry with her. Later that night, Negan and Alpha have a face to face conversation where Negan reveals how dead inside this world has made him and that he knows Alpha is just pretending to have no emotions, causing Alpha to break down. Alpha says that maybe Negan does belong with the Whisperers after all. Negan then slits Alpha's throat and decapitates her, saying "wait until Rick gets a look at you...".

The Whisperer War 
A week after disappearing, Negan turns up with Alpha's severed head and shows it to Rick and Andrea, who are very hesitant to believe and trust him. Negan reassures them that he only wants trust. He says Rick's way of thinking is inspiring and tries to convince them that his time in prison has rehabilitated him. He says he could have taken several chances and attacked Rick, but he didn't. He wants to fight with him, not against him. Rick finally agrees to let Negan out of the cell, but not in a community. He will live in an outpost, alone, with only enough food and weaponry to keep him surviving. He is not allowed these freedoms yet, though. He is going to be monitored for a long time and will fight on the front lines against the Whisperers. He will earn his freedom after the war, unless he slips up, in which case he will be immediately killed. They eventually win the war and he later admits he was wrong about his decisions and leaves to fend for himself. He is confronted by Maggie, who wants revenge for Glenn's murder, but decides not to kill him after seeing him in a depressed state. (Issue 174)

In the Letter Hacks for Issue 182, Kirkman confirmed that Negan will not return to the series. When asked if Negan would receive another barbed-wire baseball bat, Kirkman answered, "If we see Negan again - and we won't - I'd be really surprised if he had a bat with him. It feels like he put that behind him in his last appearance."

Rest in Peace 
In the final issue, set 20 years later, it is revealed that Negan is still alive. He avoids all contact with the other survivors, living on food parcels left by Carl and maintaining a state of mourning for his wife Lucille.

Television series biography

Backstory
In season 8, Negan vaguely states that he helped young people improve upon their weaknesses and molded them into stronger individuals. In the season 10 episode "Here's Negan", he is portrayed as having been a high school gym teacher. Negan later met a woman named Lucille and the pair fell in love and married. Over time, however, Negan began cheating on her. She found out about the affair and he begged her forgiveness, which she granted. Around this time, Negan was fired from his job because he assaulted a man whose kids went to the school he taught at because the man had insulted his wife. In the onset of the outbreak, Negan ventured out into the walker-filled wilderness to find medicine for Lucille's pancreatic cancer, but when he returned, he found that she had died and become a walker. He cannot bring himself to put his wife down; this act of weakness would continue to haunt him and thus Negan strived to become a much stronger person.
 
Sometime after the outbreak, Negan established himself as the tyrannical dictator of a community of survivors called the "Saviors". He wields a baseball bat wrapped in barbed wire that he calls "Lucille," after his deceased wife. Negan quickly gathered a large following and established outposts in various locations around the Washington, D.C. area. Within the structure of the Saviors, Negan has a right-hand man named Simon as well as several lieutenants, including Wade, Bud, Gavin, Arat and Dwight. At some point, Negan and the Saviors encountered the Hilltop Colony and extorted its leader Gregory into giving them half their supplies on a regular basis; failure to do so would result in the Saviors killing members of their community. To set an example, his goons used a baseball bat to beat a 16-year-old resident named Rory to death, after which Gregory submitted to Negan's demands. Negan and his men also made contact with the community known as the Kingdom and made a similar agreement with their leader King Ezekiel. At some point, Dwight fled the Saviors with his wife Sherry, sister-in-law Tina, and a truck full of supplies that they refer to as Patty. Negan subsequently sent out a large group, led by Wade, to retrieve them and the stolen supplies.

Season 6 

The Saviors become the main antagonists during the second half of season 6 and with their mysterious leader known as Negan being mentioned several times prior to his appearance in the season finale. His name is first heard in "No Way Out" when a group of bikers, led by a man named Bud, accost Daryl Dixon (Norman Reedus), Abraham Ford (Michael Cudlitz), and Sasha Williams (Sonequa Martin-Green), and attempt to steal their weapons, but Daryl kills them with a rocket launcher.

In the season finale, "Last Day on Earth", while driving the ailing Maggie Greene (Lauren Cohan) to the Hilltop, Rick Grimes (Andrew Lincoln) and his group run into multiple roadblocks set by the Saviors, which eventually causes Rick's group to travel by foot. While walking through the woods, the group is ambushed by a large contingent of the Saviors led by Negan's right-hand man Simon (Steven Ogg), who take Rick and his group's weapons and make them get on their knees.

Dwight also brings out Daryl, Glenn Rhee (Steven Yeun), Michonne (Danai Gurira), and Rosita Espinosa (Christian Serratos), and makes them get on their knees, as well. Negan then comes out of their RV and tells Rick that he must give him all of his possessions, and that Rick and everyone else at Alexandria work for Negan now; he "owns" them. Because Rick's group killed a lot of Saviors, Negan tells Rick's group they have to be punished, and he is going to beat one of them to death with "Lucille", a baseball bat wrapped in barbed wire. Negan chooses the victim in a game of "Eeny, meeny, miny, moe", which he recites while pointing Lucille at each member of the group, before landing on an unseen individual, saying, "you are it." Negan warns the group not to say anything or to move, and he begins to beat the unseen individual to death, as everyone else in the group screams.

Season 7 

Negan's chosen victim is Abraham, whom he bludgeons to death with Lucille. Enraged, Daryl rushes Negan and punches him in the face, only to be stopped by three Saviors. As a reprisal for Daryl's attack, Negan beats Glenn to death in front of Maggie, Glenn's wife. Negan then presents Rick with an ultimatum: pledge total loyalty, or the rest of the group will die. When Rick remains defiant, Negan threatens to kill Rick's son Carl (Chandler Riggs) and the rest of the group unless Rick cuts the boy's arm off. After some hesitation, Rick raises the axe; Negan stops him, satisfied that he has broken the elder Grimes' spirit. Negan then allows the surviving members of the group to depart with the warning that the Saviors will return in a week to collect their supplies. As insurance against further retaliation, Negan takes Daryl with him.

Negan is shown to rule the Sanctuary (the main Savior stronghold) through fear and rewarding his personal army of enforcers (who identify themselves as "Negan" in a show of loyalty). He keeps Daryl locked in a cell and hopes to break his spirit and mold him into one of his Saviors, but Daryl refuses to submit. Negan and his men arrive at Alexandria earlier than expected. He forces Rick to give him a tour and hold Lucille. Both Rick and Father Gabriel (Seth Gilliam) lie to Negan that Maggie is dead in order to protect her from Negan.

Negan later talks Carl out of shooting a Savior, and decides to take all of Alexandria's guns. When two guns go missing from the inventory, Negan threatens to kill Olivia (Ann Mahoney) unless they are found. This is later resolved when Rick finds them as well as a hunting rifle which was not in the armory. Impressed, Negan states that "this is something to build a relationship on" before telling him to find them something interesting for next time. Before leaving, Negan takes back Lucille and tells Rick that "I just slid my dick down your throat and you thanked me for it".

Negan meets his men returning with supplies from the Hilltop. They are attacked by Carl, who kills two of the Saviors and demands Negan come forward. Negan is nonchalant about the imminent danger to him, but develops a respect for Carl. He later sits Carl down and states that he wants to get to know him better, so he should uncover his eye. When Carl begrudgingly does so, Negan pokes fun at the boy's missing eye, but when he sees Carl become visibly upset, he shows genuine remorse and apologizes. He grows to genuinely like Carl, and later brings him to watch as he burns Mark (Griffin Freeman), a Savior who has displeased him, with a hot iron to teach everyone a lesson about "following the rules". He then decides to bring Carl back to Alexandria, where they wait for Rick.

Negan is approached in Alexandria by Spencer Monroe (Austin Nichols), who attempts to bond with him over whiskey and a game of pool. The two seem to hit it off, until Spencer tells Negan about how dangerous Rick is and that he should be in charge for both of their sakes. Negan states that while Rick hates him, he respects that Rick was brave enough to threaten him and swallow his pride to protect others. Disappointed that Spencer "has no guts" for going to him while Rick is gone, Negan eviscerates Spencer with a knife while jokingly stating that "he did have guts after all." This provokes Rosita, Spencer's girlfriend, to draw a gun and shoot at Negan, though she misses and instead hits Lucille. Enraged, Negan threatens to have Rosita's face mutilated unless she tells him where she got the bullet. When she refuses, Negan tells his lieutenant Arat (Elizabeth Ludlow) to kill someone, and she kills Olivia. Rick, having just arrived, sees this and demands to know what happened. Negan calmly replies that he has tried to be reasonable as he returned Carl unharmed and killed Spencer for Rick. When Eugene Porter (Josh McDermitt) confesses to making the bullet, Negan takes him prisoner and tells Rick that he is "way in the hole" for this incident no matter how many supplies they gather, before departing. After this, Rick finally knows he has to stop Negan, and hereby attempts to convince other communities to put an end to Negan's reign of terror by forming an alliance to defeat their common enemy.

Negan reappears in "Hostiles and Calamities" where he greets Eugene entering the Sanctuary. After determining that Eugene is indeed highly intelligent, Negan allows him to get comfortable within the Sanctuary and even sends him two of his "wives" to provide him with company. When Negan discovers that Sherry (Christine Evangelista), one of his concubines, is gone, he suspects her of freeing Daryl and has his minion Dwight (Austin Amelio) - Sherry's husband - beaten and thrown in a cell. When he is convinced that Dwight was not involved and is still loyal, he sends him after Sherry, only to learn that she supposedly was killed by walkers. When he finds evidence of Dr. Carson aiding in Daryl's escape (secretly planted by Dwight), Negan throws him in the fire-pit before apologizing to Dwight for doubting him, and offering condolences for his loss.

Negan visits a captive Sasha (who came to the Sanctuary to kill him) and discovers one of his Saviors, David (Martinez), attempting to rape her. Negan states that rape is against their rules and that he will not tolerate such behavior. David apologizes, but Negan rams a knife through his throat, stating he does not "accept his apology". He then apologizes to Sasha and gets her a new T-shirt to replace the one David ripped before complimenting her on her brazen attack. After confirming Rick didn't sanction it, Negan states that she would make a welcome addition to the Saviors, despite his actions against her. He then leaves her with a knife and a choice: kill herself or kill David once he reanimates to show him she is willing to work with him. He later returns to find, to his delight, that she has killed David. He takes the knife back and informs her that she is on the right path before stating he knows Rick is conspiring against him as he has a spy in his midst.

Negan leads a convoy of Saviors to Alexandria with Simon, Dwight, Eugene and Sasha in tow with plans to bring Rick back under his control. He reveals the Scavengers (a group of survivors Rick paid to help them) are actually working for him as they hold Rick at gunpoint. Negan brings a coffin forward and reveals Sasha is inside, stating they can have her back alive and he will let most of them live if they meet his demands, which include all their weapons, Daryl returned to him and for Rick to pick someone to be killed by Lucille. He opens the coffin to find Sasha has died and reanimated as a walker. After fending her off, the situation devolves into a gunfight. Negan manages to capture Rick and Carl, and prepares to kill Carl. Unfortunately for Negan, the Saviors are ambushed by King Ezekiel (Khary Payton) and forces from the Kingdom, as well as by Maggie leading a group from Hilltop. Caught off guard by Rick's reinforcements and rapidly losing men, Negan orders a retreat. Once back at the Sanctuary, he questions Eugene as to how Sasha died in the coffin (suspecting foul play on his part) before declaring to the assembled Saviors that they are going to war.

Season 8 

Negan appears in the season premiere, "Mercy," when Rick leads an army of assembled survivors outside the Sanctuary. More amused than worried, Negan refuses to march his people out to fight Rick just to prove "that my dick is bigger than yours". Rick offers Negan's lieutenants and the Saviors inside the chance to surrender, but states that Negan still has to die. Negan attempts to divide them by bringing out Hilltop Governor Gregory (Xander Berkeley) to order the residents to retreat, but this tactic fails. They open fire, decimating the Sanctuary walls, but Negan and his people take cover. They are then surprised by a massive herd of walkers led by Daryl before the gates are blown open and the herd funnels inside. Negan is trapped in a trailer with Gabriel.

"The Big Scary U" opens in the Sanctuary prior to Rick's attack with Negan meeting with his chief lieutenants. When Simon suggests they wipe out one of the communities entirely, Negan becomes incensed, stating that people are critical to what they are building. He instead wants to capture and publicly execute Rick, Maggie and Ezekiel to cow their people into submission. The episode then returns to Negan and Gabriel in the trailer, discussing their views on survival. When Gabriel tries to get Negan to confess his sins, he is evasive until he finally admits his greatest regret was his treatment of his first wife prior to the outbreak, stating she died of cancer and he could not bring himself to put her down. The two manage to escape by "gutting up" and Negan is able reassert control of the spiraling situation in the Sanctuary.

Negan returns to Alexandria to counterattack when he is met by Carl (who, unbeknownst to Negan, is dying from a walker bite) who attempts to dissuade him from attacking and even offers to be killed to spare the rest. He asks Negan if this is what he wanted or who he wanted to be, and his words seem to strike a chord. Negan attacks Alexandria anyway, however, and confronts Rick. After a brutal hand-to-hand fight, he throws Rick through a window. Rick retreats into the sewers with Michonne and the rest of the Alexandrians.

Negan meets with Simon to handle the matter of the Scavengers. Simon assumes he wants them exterminated, but Negan instead wants him to give them the standard warning and kill only one. Rick later contacts him via walkie-talkie, and informs him that Carl is dead and that his last wish was for them to make peace, something Rick sees as impossible. Genuinely saddened by the news, Negan offers Rick his condolences before asking him to surrender, to no avail. Negan begins preparing the Saviors for an attack on Hilltop to end the war.

Negan comes up with a plan to use the walker virus to their advantage by coating their weapons in walker flesh, including Lucille. Negan leads a convoy of Saviors to the Hilltop when his car is rammed by Rick, who pursues him into an abandoned building. Negan attempts to fight back, but falls through the floor and loses Lucille. Unarmed and being hunted in the dark, Negan attempts to make a deal, offering to forgive Rick's transgressions and reduce the Savior's cut of supplies in exchange for peace. Rick refuses, stating Negan cares for nothing except Lucille, which he then proceeds to light on fire. Negan furiously attacks Rick before the two are surrounded by walkers and flames, forcing Negan to reclaim Lucille and flee — only to be captured by Jadis (Pollyanna McIntosh), who tortures Negan until he reveals that he had nothing to do with the massacre of her people. He manages to talk her into freeing him while she is getting ready to receive a helicopter at the junkyard.

He makes his way back to the Savior compound to find that Simon has been ruling in his stead, and is responsible for the bloodshed at Jadis' compound. He regains control by challenging Simon to a fight and killing him with his bare hands, and making Dwight the instrument of his revenge against Rick by forcing him to lure Rick's group into a trap with false information. Michonne contacts Negan via walkie-talkie and reads him a letter Carl wrote him before he died urging a peaceful solution to the conflict; though moved by the message, Negan refuses, and swears he will kill Rick and every last one of his group. Rick's group shows up to challenge the Saviors. Negan orders his men to open fire, but discovers that Eugene has tampered with their weapons, rendering them helpless. Rick's group kills several of Negan's men, while Rick and Negan have a final battle that ends with Rick cutting Negan's throat open. However, Rick decides to save his enemy's life, as he believes it is what Carl would want.

Season 9 

18 months later, Rick goes down a basement to talk to an imprisoned Negan, telling him about how everything has changed since the war ended, and how the communities are working together on fixing a bridge, which will be the link to their future. Negan warns him that the peace between the communities will not last, and that he will not be locked up forever.

When Michonne visits Negan to get him to end a hunger strike, he tells her about his late wife, Lucille, and says he is thankful that she is not alive to see him in his current state. She finally gets him to eat, and as she leaves he asks to see his bat. Michonne tells him they do not have it anymore, and leaves smiling as he bashes his head against the wall in anguish. Maggie arrives in Alexandria and arranges to see Negan in his cell, intent on killing him. Negan taunts Maggie about killing Glenn, but then bursts into tears and begs her to put him out of his misery so he can be reunited with his wife. She tells him to get back to his cell, because he is already "worse than dead".

Six years later, Negan remains a prisoner in Alexandria, but has apparently accepted his fate, and has even struck up a friendship with Judith Grimes (Cailey Fleming), Rick's young daughter. Negan helps Judith with her homework and tells her a story from his childhood where he tried to take in stray dogs only for it to go badly for him when she asks for advice with dealing with Magna's group. Negan also receives weekly visits from Gabriel, who tries to help Negan become a better person. Negan responds by taunting Gabriel about his new relationship with Rosita, but Gabriel reveals that Rosita is at the Hilltop, hurt, and he cannot go to her because he has to look after Negan. Chastened, Negan makes an apparently sincere apology for his behavior, a first for him.

Later, Negan realizes that his cell door is unlocked, and escapes. Judith tries to stop him, but lets him go after he persuades her that he will not hurt anyone else. Negan wanders through the changed world, losing his food following an encounter with two walkers and inadvertently returning to the clearing where he murdered Glenn and Abraham. Negan gets a new leather jacket from an abandoned clothing store, but is nearly killed by a pack of feral dogs in the process. Negan finally returns to the Sanctuary, only to find it completely abandoned and all of the Saviors gone. Negan tries to adapt to life alone, but eventually abandons the Sanctuary and his old life for good and returns to Alexandria. Confronted by Judith, Negan admits that she was right that there is nothing left for him outside and he is willing to return to his cell rather than be alone. Negan then allows Judith to take him back to Alexandria.

Negan is visited by Michonne after Judith disappears. Negan's cell now contains a bookshelf with several books and a small seat where he can comfortably read. Michonne demands to know what Negan talks to Judith about, and he admits to telling her stories about Carl, Rick, and the war, stories which Judith has never heard from anyone else before. Negan points out that Judith would be able to tell if he was lying so he is always honest with her, even when she asked about Glenn and Abraham. Negan urges Michonne to listen to and be honest with her daughter and helps her realize that Judith went to try and help her friends.

Negan is moved out of his cell during a dangerous blizzard, as he will freeze to death otherwise. Negan is the first to realize that something is wrong, leading to Eugene discovering that the chimney is clogged. Though everyone contemplates leaving Negan to die, they take him with them as they travel to Aaron's house. However, Judith hears Daryl's dog barking and runs off into the storm. Negan risks his own life to chase after Judith and save her, finding her by following the barking dog, though his leg is injured by flying debris in the process. Negan saves Judith and the dog, and carries them to shelter. The next day, a recovering Negan is visited in the infirmary by a grateful Michonne.

Season 10 

Following the storm, Negan is allowed some leeway and works in Alexandria as a gardener and maintenance man under guard, until Gabriel pairs him up with Aaron (Ross Marquand) to protect Alexandria from repeated walker attacks. After being attacked by Walkers while on patrol, Aaron is temporarily blinded and struggles his way to a cabin, where he finds Negan, who helps him. The two then return to Alexandria. While defending Lydia (Cassady McClincy) from an attack by a group of thieves called the Highwaymen, Negan kills one of their number, Margo (Jerri Tubbs), in self-defense and faces possible execution. He escapes, aided by Brandon (Blaine Kern III), the son of a former Savior who is a fan of his. After Negan attempts to get a woman and her son to safety at the Hilltop, Brandon kills them both to impress him. Enraged, Negan beats him to death.

Apparently reverting to his old ways and armed with a new Lucille created by Brandon, Negan joins the Whisperers, a rival faction bent on destroying the other communities, and becomes the right hand and lover of their leader, Alpha (Samantha Morton). Negan aids in the attack on Hilltop, having the Whisperers block the roads so that the Hilltop residents cannot easily escape, though Negan tries to convince Alpha to spare their lives and offer them a choice to join her. Following the attack, Negan encounters Aaron, who blames him for the death of his partner Eric (Jordan Woods-Robinson) six years earlier. Negan captures Lydia and brings Alpha to what she thinks is her location, but it is revealed that Negan hid the girl elsewhere to lure Alpha into a trap; he then slits Alpha's throat, killing her. Negan subsequently is accepted by Daryl as a tentative ally of the communities following learning of his assassination of Alpha on Carol's orders. When the final battle comes, Negan at first refuses to take any part despite his greater experience in walking amongst the dead, knowing that Beta and the other Whisperers will be gunning for him and going so far as to tell Lydia that getting involved is futile and it will end badly. However, Lydia apparently changes his mind and Negan suddenly appears to distract Beta from going after Lydia, giving Daryl the distraction that he needs to finally take down Beta. After the battle, Negan tells Lydia that he intends to stay at least for the time being. However, he is dismayed to see that Maggie has returned, and begins trying to stay out of her way, knowing that she wants him dead.

In "Here's Negan," continuing tensions between Negan and Maggie provoke Carol into exiling him to a cabin in the woods. After hallucinating his younger self taunting him, Negan returns to the tree where Rick almost killed him and digs up his old baseball bat Lucille, which has been buried for years. In a series of flashbacks, Negan is depicted 12 years earlier, in the early days of the apocalypse, as a former high school gym teacher and the loving but unfaithful husband of a woman named Lucille (Hilarie Burton). After Lucille is diagnosed with cancer, Negan devotes himself to caring for her, but her chemotherapy drugs are ruined when their generator breaks. Negan searches out a group of traveling doctors for help and, six weeks later, finds a doctor named Franklin (Miles Mussenden) and his daughter Laura (Lindsley Register), who give him the drugs he needs; Laura also gives Negan a baseball bat for protection. On his way home, however, he is captured by a biker gang and forced to give up Franklin and Laura's location. Returning home, Negan discovers that Lucille has committed suicide and reanimated as a zombie. Heartbroken, he wraps Laura's bat in barbed wire from his fence and burns his house down with Lucille inside. Returning to the bar where the bikers had held him prisoner, Negan rescues Franklin and Laura and subdues the gang's leader, Craven (Rod Rowland). Negan describes how he had lost his job after beating up a man who was rude to his wife, and tells Craven that, in this new world, he no longer needs to rein in his dark side; he then beats Craven to death with the bat which he has named Lucille.

In the present, Negan kills a walker with Lucille, but the old bat finally breaks from the blow combined with its brittle condition and the abuse that Negan has put it through. Returning to the cabin, Negan says a final goodbye to Lucille, coming to terms with and apologizing for his mistakes. After burning Lucille in the fireplace, Negan returns to Alexandria to live full time, despite Carol's warnings that Maggie will kill him if he stays. As Negan reenters Alexandria, he smirks at a glaring Maggie.

Season 11 

In season 11, taking place shortly after "Here's Negan," Negan joins a mission to reclaim Maggie's old village Meridian from the Reapers, the antagonistic group that had taken it and wiped out most of Maggie's people. Maggie takes Negan along ostensibly because of his knowledge of the Washington, D.C. area that they are going to be passing through, but Negan suspects that Maggie intends to take the chance to kill him. After Maggie threatens him, Negan chooses to let her fall from a train car into a horde of walkers. When Maggie survives the fall, Negan defends his actions as him simply choosing not to save Maggie in order to protect himself.

Following an ambush by the Reapers, most of the team is either killed or separated. During a brief skirmish, Maggie and Negan work together to kill one of the Reapers, but they are subsequently forced to leave behind a severely injured Alden (Callan McAuliffe) in order to continue their mission. Left alone, Maggie and Negan are forced to rely on each other and often clash, but they prove to be a good team. They eventually reunite with Gabriel and Maggie's friend Elijah (Okea Eme-Akwari) and come up with a new plan to lead a massive horde to attack Meridian and take out the Reapers. In exchange for Maggie letting go of her revenge against him, Negan agrees to train Maggie in how to be a Whisperer. Maggie later privately admits to Elijah that she does not know if she can keep her word to Negan, but she hopes that she can. During this time, Negan has a frank conversation with Maggie about Glenn's death, pointing out that Rick and the others had struck first and massacred some of his people, which he says forced him to respond in kind. Negan admits that if he could do it all over again, he would have killed everyone in Rick's group, as it would have saved the lives of many of his people.

After gathering a massive horde and preparing Whisperer masks, the group marches on Meridian, where they are aided by Daryl, who has infiltrated the Reapers' ranks. However, the assault goes awry when Leah Shaw (Lynn Collins) kills the Reaper leader Pope (Ritchie Coster) and orders a rocket barrage into the courtyard where Maggie, Negan, Daryl, Elijah and the walkers are located. Negan ultimately helps Maggie's group defeat Pope, but then goes off on his own upon realizing that Maggie will never let go of her hatred of him.

Six months later, Negan meets and marries a woman named Annie (Medina Senghore), and she gets pregnant with his child. The two of them join the Commonwealth community, which puts Negan back in contact with Maggie and Daryl's groups. They reluctantly join forces with him to defeat the Commonwealth's corrupt Governor Pamela Milton (Laila Robins). He saves Maggie's son Hershel (Kien Michael Spiller) from being killed by Milton's guards, but the boy condemns him for killing his father and pulls a gun on him, relenting only when Negan admits what he did and apologizes. Maggie sees that having a family has changed Negan for the better, and slowly begins to trust him.

Negan and Daryl infiltrate the Commonwealth while wearing Negan's old Whisperer masks. Negan is captured and interrogated by Michael Mercer (Michael James Shaw), the head of Commonwealth's security force. When Milton's narcissistic son Sebastian (Teo Rapp-Olsson) goes on the run after being caught stealing from tax money, Negan and Carol save him from being killed by angry Commonwealth residents and bring him to his mother. Nevertheless, Milton does nothing to help Negan when her treacherous right-hand man Lance Hornsby (Josh Hamilton) imprisons him, Annie, and Ezekiel in Commonwealth's labor camp.

The camp's sadistic warden (Michael Weaver) singles Negan out for his harshest abuse, determined to break him and use him to keep the other prisoners in line, but Negan remains defiant and makes an uneasy alliance with Ezekiel to plan an escape. The warden foils the escape attempt, however, and lines up Negan, Ezekiel, and Annie to be executed via firing squad. At the last moment, Negan and Ezekiel manage to convince the soldiers not to let the warden turn them into murderers, and they turn on their hated boss. Maggie, Gabriel, and Rosita then arrive to free them.

In the series finale, "Rest in Peace," Negan joins the coalition of soldiers and freed prisoners to fight Milton as a herd of walkers head toward the Commonwealth. He and Maggie act as snipers, picking off walkers that get too close to the community's main gates, which Milton has sealed off to protect her own home while leaving thousands of residents to die as the walkers swarm in. After Mercer overthrows and arrests Milton, she attempts to feed herself to a zombiefied Hornsby, but Negan and Maggie save her life after deciding that, for Milton, life in prison would be a far worse punishment than death.

After the horde is destroyed, Negan has a final talk with Maggie. He expresses remorse for killing Glenn and says that, after nearly losing his wife and unborn child, he finally understands what he did to her. Maggie replies that she will never forgive him, but she will try to move on past her anger for her own sake and that of her son. Negan accepts her decision, and he and Annie leave the Commonwealth together to begin a new life.

Other appearances 
Negan appears as a playable guest character in the fighting video game Tekken 7, added as the sixth and final part of the second season pass on February 28, 2019, with his appearance based on his television counterpart; Jeffrey Dean Morgan reprised his role. Negan also appeared as a playable character in Brawlhalla. In March 2022, AMC announced that Negan and Maggie (another TWD protagonist), will be in a spin-off called The Walking Dead: Dead City. Both roles will be played by the same actors from the original series.

Reception 
The character of Negan has been praised by both fans and critics as an antagonist of the series. IGN on their review of Negan's first appearance, the 100th issue said: "The new villain already looks to be worthy addition to the book's cast. I didn't realize how much I missed having a truly awful antagonist like The Governor in this series until now. The villain's voice is very distinct, allowing Kirkman to toy with a very different approach to dialogue. For a series where the characters sometimes ramble on too much without making a clear point, this character is very much appreciated." On their review for Issue #103, IGN felt Negan was "quickly giving the Governor a run for his money in the villainy department". When Negan's community was explored as well as his relationship with Carl Grimes, it was said that "There's a palpable tension as we wonder what fate Negan has in mind for his young enemy. But even at his most sinister, Negan remains strangely charismatic. It's not difficult to understand how he managed to build such a lofty position for himself, complete with multiple wives and the total devotion of an entire town." Noel Murray of Rolling Stone ranked Negan 10th in a list of 30 best Walking Dead characters, saying, "it would've been hard for any villain to live up to the hype, but thanks to Jeffrey Dean Morgan's grinning, relaxed performance and some genuinely shocking acts of violence, Negan has been firmly established as a formidable enemy. The alarming ease of his cruelty and the rigors of his organization represent a worldview that's been both fascinating and frightening to explore." Negan was ranked third on TV Fanatic's list of "21 Sexy TV Characters Deserving of a Beach Day." The Telegraph finds Negan as "fancy".

During seasons 7 and 8, Negan was also lambasted by some critics as a "complete idiot,"  "at the center of all the show's problems,"  and "ridiculous."

The confrontation between Negan and Rick Grimes has been compared to the enduring rivalry between DC Comics characters Joker and Batman. Fans were shocked and disturbed by Negan and Alpha's sex scene in episode 10 of The Walking Dead. Angela Kang of The Hollywood Reporter has stated that "We always felt like we needed some of the story of Alpha, Negan and their strange relationship."

References

External links 
 Negan on IMDb

Characters created by Robert Kirkman
Comics characters introduced in 2012
Fictional characters from Virginia
Fictional gangsters
Fictional mass murderers
Fictional schoolteachers
Fictional sports coaches
Fictional clubfighters
Fictional torturers
The Walking Dead (franchise) characters
Fictional cult leaders
Fictional janitors
Fictional horticulturists and gardeners
Fictional prison escapees
Image Comics male characters